The 1989 UC Davis football team represented the University of California, Davis as a member of the Northern California Athletic Conference (NCAC) during the 1989 NCAA Division II football season. Led by first-year head coach Bob Foster, the Aggies compiled an overall record of 8–3 with a mark of 5–0 in conference play, winning the NCAC title for the 19th consecutive season. UC Davis outscored its opponents 303 to 202 for the season. The Aggies played home games at Toomey Field in Davis, California.

Schedule

Notes

References

UC Davis
UC Davis Aggies football seasons
Northern California Athletic Conference football champion seasons
UC Davis Aggies football